The 2009 Montreux Volley Masters was held in Montreux, Switzerland between 9 June and 14 June 2009. In the tournament participated 8 teams.

Participated teams

 Brazil
 China
 Cuba
 Germany
 Italy
 Japan
 Netherlands
 Poland

Groups

Group A

|}

Results

Group B

|}

Results

Final round

Semi-finals

3rd-place match

Final match

Classification matches (5th–8th place)

Classification match (5th–6th place)

Final standings

Awards
Winners:
 MVP  Fabiana Claudino
 Best Spiker  Xue Ming
 Best Blocker  Caroline Gattaz
 Best Server  Chaïne Staelens
 Best Libero  Fabiana de Oliveira

References

External links
 Official Page of 2009 Montreux Volley Masters

Montreux Volley Masters
Montreux Volley Masters
Montreux Volley Masters